The 2012 StuSells Toronto Tankard was held from October 5 to 8 at the High Park Club in Toronto, Ontario as part of the 2012–13 World Curling Tour. The event was held in a triple knockout format for the men's event, and in a round robin format for the women's event. The purse for the men's event was CAD$45,000, and the winner, Jeff Stoughton, received CAD$15,000. The purse for the women's event was CAD$15,000, and the winner, Mary-Anne Arsenault, received CAD$5,000. Stoughton defeated Joe Frans in the men's final with a score of 6–2, while Arsenault defeated Lisa Farnell in the women's final with a score of 7–2.

Men

Teams
The teams are listed as follows:

Knockout results
The draw is listed as follows:

A event

B event

C event

Playoffs

Women

Teams

The teams are listed as follows:

Round-robin standings
Final round-robin standings

Playoffs

References

External links

StuSells Toronto
StuSells Toronto
StuSells Toronto
Curling in Toronto